The 2021 Damallsvenskan was the 34th season of the Swedish women's association football top division, Damallsvenskan. The league began on 17 April 2021, and ended on 6 November 2021.

Hammarby and AIK returned to the top tier after 2 years and 5 years in Elitettan respectively.

All matches are viewed worldwide, except for Mexico, for a fee at Damallsvenskan TV . Aftonbladet have bought broadcasting rights for all Damallsvenskan matches from 2020 to 2022 and will have them available at Sportbladet Play.

Summary
The game Hammarby IF–AIK (4–1) on 10 October was played at Tele2 Arena in Stockholm, in front of 18 537 spectators, leading to a new Damallsvenskan record attendance.

Teams 

Notes:
a According to each club information page previously available at the Swedish Football Association website for Damallsvenskan, unless otherwise noted. Since May 2018 this is no longer present. Numbers were usually lower than official stadium numbers.
b According to Kristianstads DFF's history web page.

Standings

Results

Positions by Round
The table lists the positions of teams after each week of matches. In order to preserve chronological progress, any postponed matches are not included in the round at which they were originally scheduled, but added to the full round they were played immediately afterwards. For example, if a match is scheduled for round 13, but then postponed and played between rounds 16 and 17, it will be added to the standings for round 16.

Results by round

Player statistics

Top scorers

Top assists

References

External links 
 Season at soccerway.com
 Season at SvFF
 Damallsvenskan TV   – Video streaming of all matches both live and archived
 Sportbladet Play  – Video streaming of all matches both live and archived

Damallsvenskan seasons
Sweden
Sweden
2021 in Swedish association football leagues
2021 in Swedish women's football